Nelly Korda (born July 28, 1998) is an American professional golfer who plays on the LPGA Tour, where she has won seven times and reached number one in the Women's World Golf Rankings. Korda won the Olympic gold medal at the women's individual golf event at the 2020 Summer Olympics in Tokyo, Japan. Along with her sister Jessica Korda, she represented the United States at the 2019 Solheim Cup and 2021 Solheim Cup.

Amateur career
Korda was a member of the 2015 U.S. Junior Solheim Cup. As an amateur, she won the 2015 Harter Hall Invitational, and the 2015 PING Invitational, and was a 2015 AJGA Rolex Junior All-American. She also made the cut at the 2013 U.S. Women's Open, one month before her 15th birthday.

Professional career
Korda began her pro career in 2016 on the Symetra Tour, where she won her first pro event at the Sioux Falls GreatLIFE Challenge after shooting rounds of 68-67-69-66 for a 3 stroke victory over Wichanee Meechai. She ended the season 9th on the money list, thus earning her LPGA Tour card for 2017.

2018: First LPGA win
On October 28, 2018, Korda won the Swinging Skirts LPGA Taiwan Championship in Taoyuan, Taiwan for her first LPGA Tour title. This win made her and her sister Jessica Korda the third pair of sisters to win in LPGA history, joining the Jutanugarn sisters, Moriya Jutanugarn and Ariya Jutanugarn, along with Charlotta and Annika Sörenstam.

2019−2020: Continued success
After settling for runner-up at the CME Group Tour Championship and solo 3rd at the Diamond Resorts Tournament of Champions, Korda won the ISPS Handa Women's Australian Open on February 17, 2019. In doing so, she completed a "Family Slam" in Australia. Her father, Petr, won the 1998 Australian Open singles in tennis. Her older sister, Jessica Korda, won the Women's Australian Open in 2012 and her younger brother, Sebastian, won the 2018 Australian Open junior boys in tennis. The Australian Open win represented Korda's 4th top-5 finish in her most recent 5 LPGA starts. Thanks to this victory, Korda broke into the top 10 for the first time in the February 18, 2019 release of the Women's World Golf Rankings, moving up to 9th from 16th the week before, and becoming the second highest ranked American in the world, surpassed only by 5th ranked Lexi Thompson.

On September 22, 2019, Korda shot a 4-under-par 67 in blustery conditions and won the Lacoste Ladies Open de France by eight shots. On November 3, 2019, Korda defended her title at the Taiwan Swinging Skirts LPGA in a playoff.

2021: Breakout year: 4 wins, first major win, Olympic gold, #1 world rank
On February 28, 2021, Korda won the Gainbridge LPGA at Boca Rio at Lake Nona Golf and Country Club in Orlando, Florida.

On June 20, 2021, Korda won the Meijer LPGA Classic in Grand Rapids, Michigan becoming the first two time winner on the LPGA during the 2021 season. She shot a career best 62 on Saturday to take a lead into the final round.

On June 27, 2021, Korda won her first major at the KPMG Women's PGA Championship at the Atlanta Athletic Club. In the final round, Korda shot a 4-under 68 and won by three strokes over Lizette Salas. With the win, Korda became the number one player in the world.

On August 5, in round 2 of the Women's Golf at the Summer Olympics in Japan, Korda stood on the 18th tee at −11 for her round. A birdie on the 18th would have been a round of 59 but she double bogeyed the hole for a 62. On August 7, Korda won the gold medal. She became the second woman from the U.S. to win the gold, and the first since Margaret Abbott in the 1900 Olympic Games.

After Ko Jin-young won the BMW Ladies Championship on October 24, Korda fell to No. 2 in the Women's World Golf Rankings, by a narrow margin of 9.36 to 9.34 average points per event played. She regained the No. 1 spot on November 8, 2021, by a fraction of an average point per event played (9.032 to 9.028), despite neither player playing tournaments between those ranking dates, because the calculations are over a two-year rolling average.

In November, Korda won the Pelican Women's Championship in Belleair, Florida. Korda shot a final round 69 and won in a playoff over Lexi Thompson, Lydia Ko and Kim Sei-young. This was her fourth LPGA victory of 2021. She won despite a triple bogey seven on the par-4 17th hole, dropping her from co-leading at −19, to fourth-place at −16, two shots behind Thompson. Recovering on the 18th with a birdie that tied her with her playing partner, and then-leader Lexi Thompson, who then bogeyed the 18th, requiring the four-way playoff starting on the 18th hole. Korda birdied it for the win, tying her with Ko Jin-young with four wins in 2021. Ko Jin-young finished with a 66, tying for sixth place. Korda became the first American to win four times in an LPGA Tour season since Stacy Lewis in 2012.

She had the lowest scoring average on tour (68.774) in her 62 rounds, beating the money list winner Ko Jin-young (68.886) in her 67 rounds, although she finished second on the money list ($2,382,198) to Ko ($3,502,161). However, Lydia Ko won the Vare Trophy despite finishing third on the scoring average list because neither Korda nor Ko Jin-young met the 70 round minimum.

Despite a fifth-place tie in the CME Group Tour Championship to #2 world-ranked Ko Jin-young, Korda held onto her #1 spot with a 10.07 average points Ko's 9.94 in the Rolex Rankings, as of November 22.

2022: Blood clot, loss of world #1 ranking, re-gains #1 world ranking
On January 3, 2022, Korda passed Stacy Lewis as the longest American women's golfer as world #1, with her 26th consecutive week at number one in the Rolex rankings. Lewis had 25 weeks.

Three weeks later at the Gainbridge LPGA at Boca Rio tournament (January 27–30), she tied for 20th place at 286 (−2), along with her sister Jessica and five other golfers. The low placement lost her the Women's World Golf Rankings #1 position she held for 29 consecutive weeks, to the former #2 Ko Jin-young by a 0.03 difference in the average (9.48 to 9.51 for Ko), with Korda the new #2. She finished T-15, T-20, and T-4 in her first three starts for 2022.

Korda announced on her Instagram (social media) account on March 13, she had a blood clot in her arm, so she would not compete in the Chevron Championship, the year's first major. She also did not enter the JTBC Classic she originally was scheduled to compete, while resting at home getting treatment. Korda returned to play at the U.S. Women's Open, finishing in the top ten.

Korda mentioned in a November 9 interview, at the Pelican Women's Championship where she won her last tournament in 2021, that much of her time away from the tour was devoted to building her new home close to where she grew up in Bradenton, Florida. After her $300,000 earned from her second consecutive Pelican Women's Championship win on November 13, her career LPGA money total is $7,455,977, 40th all-time, right behind sister Jessica Korda at $7,543,454. Nelly has earned $7,455,977 in only 109 tournaments, less than one-half of Jessica's 227. 

Korda's first win in 2022 with a 14-under-par (three-rounds, 196), returned her to the #1 world ranking.

On 28 November, she dropped to the Number 2 ranking from Number 1 the past two weeks. Lydia Ko re-gained the Number 1 ranking for the first time since 2017.

2023
In January Korda signed a deal with TaylorMade and Nike.

With her fourth-place finish at the Hilton Grand Vacations Tournament of Champions on January 19, she earned $99,457 to jump three places from 40th to 37th on the career money list to $7,638,934 passing sister Jessica Korda, ranked 39th at $7,543,454 who did not play in the tournament. Nelly has played in 110 tournaments to Jessica's 227.

Personal life
Korda is the daughter of retired Czech professional tennis players Petr Korda and Regina Rajchrtová. Her father is a tennis grand slam champion who won the 1998 Australian Open crown.  Her younger brother, Sebastian, won the 2018 Australian Open tennis title in the boys' division. Her older sister Jessica Korda also plays on the LPGA Tour. 

In 2021, Korda made the Forbes '30 under 30 list' for earners under the age of 30, with Korda, 23.

Professional wins (12)

LPGA Tour wins (8)

LPGA Tour playoff record (2–2)

Ladies European Tour (2)

Symetra Tour wins (1)

Other wins (1)

Major championships

Wins (1)

Results timeline
Results not in chronological order before 2019 or in 2020.

CUT = missed the half-way cut
WD = withdrew
NT = no tournament
T = tied

Summary

LPGA Tour career summary

^ Official as of March 5, 2023
*Includes matchplay and other tournaments without a cut.

World ranking
Position in Women's World Golf Rankings at the end of each calendar year.

^ as of March 6, 2023

U.S. national team appearances
Amateur
Junior Solheim Cup: 2015 (winners)

Professional
Solheim Cup: 2019, 2021

Solheim Cup record

References

External links

American female golfers
LPGA Tour golfers
Winners of LPGA major golf championships
Olympic golfers of the United States
Golfers at the 2020 Summer Olympics
Medalists at the 2020 Summer Olympics
Olympic gold medalists for the United States in golf
Golfers from Florida
Sportspeople from Bradenton, Florida
American people of Czech descent
1998 births
Living people
20th-century American women
21st-century American women